The Senya R9 or Senia R9 is a compact CUV produced by Chinese car manufacturer Senya (森雅) under the FAW Jilin subsidiary of FAW Group.

Overview

The Senya R9 five-seater crossover was manufactured by FAW-Jilin, a FAW subsidiary based in Jilin Province. The CUV is positioned above the previously introduced Senia R7 subcompact crossover. The Senya R9 debuted in April 2018 on the 2018 Beijing Auto Show and was launch on the Chinese auto market in May 2018 with prices ranging from 83,900 to 125,900 yuan.

References

External links
Senia R9 Official site

R9
Front-wheel-drive vehicles
Compact cars
Cars introduced in 2018
Crossover sport utility vehicles
Cars of China